Bogan Shire is a local government area in the Orana region of New South Wales, Australia. The Shire is located adjacent to the Mitchell and Barrier highways and its only significant town is Nyngan.

The Municipality of Nyngan was proclaimed on 17 February 1891 with Nyngan having a population of 1,355. Bogan Shire was proclaimed on 7 May 1906. Bogan Shire absorbed the Municipality of Nyngan on 1 January 1972.

The Mayor of Bogan Shire Council is Cr. Glen Neill, who is unaligned with any political party.

Demographics

Incomes
According to the Australian Bureau of Statistics during 2003-04 there:
were 798 wage and salary earners (ranked 151st in New South Wales and 484th in Australia, less than 0.1% of both New South Wales's 2,558,415 and Australia's 7,831,856)
was a total income of $26 million (ranked 150th in New South Wales and 484th in Australia, less than 0.1% of both New South Wales's $107 billion and Australia's $304 billion)
was an estimated average income per wage and salary earner of $32,823 (ranked 99th in New South Wales and 338th in Australia, 79% of New South Wales's $41,407 and 85% of Australia's $38,820)
was an estimated median income per wage and salary earner of $29,413 (ranked 111th in New South Wales and 388th in Australia, 83% of New South Wales's $35,479 and 86% of Australia's $34,149).

Council

Current composition and election method
Bogan Shire Council is composed of nine Councillors elected proportionally as a single ward. All Councillors are elected for a fixed four-year term of office. The Mayor is elected by the Councillors at the first meeting of the Council. The most recent election was held on 4 December 2021, and the makeup of the Council is as follows:

The current Council, elected in 2021, in order of election, is:

Meteorology

Bogan Shire is supported by agricultural production, grazing of sheep and cattle and cropping, primarily wheat. However, there is great variability in the rainfall.

References 

 
Local government areas of New South Wales